Episode in the Life of an Iron Picker is 2013 Bosnian drama film written and directed by Danis Tanović. The film premiered in competition at the 63rd Berlin International Film Festival where it won the Jury Grand Prix and Nazif Mujić won the Silver Bear for Best Actor. It was screened in the Contemporary World Cinema section at the 2013 Toronto International Film Festival. The film was selected as the Bosnian entry for the Best Foreign Language Film at the 86th Academy Awards, making the January shortlist.

Plot
A Roma family lives in the Bosnia-Herzegovina countryside. Nazif salvages metal from old cars, selling it to a scrapmetal-dealer. His partner, Senada, is a housewife who looks after their two small daughters. One day, she feels an acute stomach pain. At the hospital, she is told her unborn child has died and, to prevent septicaemia, she should have an operation urgently. However, without funds or insurance, they cannot afford treatment. The couple seek desperately to raise the necessary funds before it is too late.

The film is played by a cast of non-professional actors re-enacting an episode from their own lives.

Cast
 Nazif Mujić as Nazif
 Senada Alimanović as Senada
 Šemsa Mujić as Šemsa
 Sandra Mujić as Sandra

See also
 List of submissions to the 86th Academy Awards for Best Foreign Language Film
 List of Bosnian submissions for the Academy Award for Best Foreign Language Film

References

External links
 

2013 films
2013 drama films
Bosnian-language films
Bosnia and Herzegovina drama films
Films directed by Danis Tanović
Films about Romani people
Silver Bear Grand Jury Prize winners